The Subbaetic or Sub-Baetic System ( or Cordillera Subbética) is one of the three systems of mountain ranges of the Baetic System in the southern Iberian Peninsula. Its northern limit includes the valley of the Guadalquivir in its western part.

Description
The Subbaetic System runs to the north of the Cordillera Penibética from Cape Trafalgar in Cádiz Province across Andalusia reaching into the Region of Murcia. The highest peaks reach heights between 1,500m and well over 2,000 m.

Towards the east of the Sierra Sur de Jaén, east of Martos, another subsystem begins, the Prebaetic System, an offshoot of the Subbaetic System stretching further northeastwards. The materials that compose this eastern sector were formed in a relatively shallow sea.

Main mountain ranges
Some of the mountain ranges that make up the Subbaetic System are, from west to east:
Sierra del Aljibe, includes the Alcornocales Natural Park
 Sierra de Grazalema
Sierra Sur de Sevilla, highest points Terril (1,132 m) and Peñón de Algámitas (1,128 m)
Subbaetic Ranges of Córdoba
Sierra de Rute, highest point 1,326 m
Sierra de la Horconera, highest point Pico Tiñosa (1,570 m), highest point in Córdoba Province, and Pico Bermejo (1,476 m)
Sierra de los Pollos, close to Carcabuey and Priego de Córdoba
Sierra de Gaena
Sierra de Jarcas
Sierra de los Lanchares, includes interesting formations, like the Lapiaz de los Lanchares
Sierra del Lobatejo, highest point 1,217 m
Sierra Alcaide
Picacho de la Sierra de Cabra, highest point 1,217 m, includes the Ermita de la Virgen de la Sierra
 Sierra de Gibalbín
 Sierra Elvira
Sierra de Parapanda
 Sierra de Loja
 Sierra Harana
Sierra de Cogollos
 Sierra de Huétor
Sierra de la Alfaguara
 Sierra Sur de Jaén, overlapping with the Sistema Prebético.

See also
Prebaetic System
Baetic Cordillera

References

External links
Morfología karstica del sector central de la Cordillera Subbética
Granada Natural - Las Zonas Externas
Relleno sedimentario y destrucción de una pequeña cuenca fluvio-lacustre en la Sierra Sur de Jaén (Cordilleras Béticas)

Baetic System
Physiographic provinces
Environment of the Mediterranean
Mountain ranges of Andalusia
Mountain ranges of the Region of Murcia